The England cricket team toured South Africa during the 1927–28 season, playing five Test matches against the South Africa national team and 13 tour matches under the banner of the Marylebone Cricket Club against local sides. The tour began on 12 November 1927 with a match against Western Province and ended on 21 February 1928 at the conclusion of another match against the same side. The five Tests were played between 24 December 1927 and 8 February 1928. The Test series was drawn 2–2, with England winning the first two and South Africa the last two, with a drawn Test in the middle.

Guy Jackson was selected as the captain of the touring side in July 1927. He withdrew in October owing to illness. He was replaced by RT Stanyforth as the captain and Percy Holmes as a player.

Test series

1st Test

2nd Test

3rd Test

4th Test

5th Test

References

External links
Series archive at ESPNcricinfo
Series home at ESPNcricinfo
Marylebone Cricket Club in South Africa 1927-28 at CricketArchive

1927-28
International cricket competitions from 1918–19 to 1945
South African cricket seasons from 1918–19 to 1944–45